"A Song for the Lovers" is a song by English singer-songwriter Richard Ashcroft, included as the opening track on his 2000 album, Alone with Everybody, as well as his first solo single following the break-up of the Verve. The song was released on 3 April 2000 as the first single from the album in the United Kingdom. "A Song for the Lovers" was originally written by Richard Ashcroft as a demo track for the Verve's studio album Urban Hymns; three different versions were recorded, but the song did not make the final cut. It was inspired by Joy Division's "Love Will Tear Us Apart".

The single peaked at number three on the UK Singles Chart, a position that would be matched by Ashcroft's 2006 single "Break the Night with Colour". Outside the UK, the song became a moderate hit in Europe and Oceania, peaking at number nine in Italy, number 11 in Ireland, number 42 in New Zealand, and number 59 in Australia. The single also sold well in Canada, peaking at number six on the Canadian Singles Chart.

Music video

The music video for "A Song for the Lovers" premiered in May 2000 and was directed by Jonathan Glazer. The video is of narrative style. It is shot in real-time with an element of diegetic sound unusual in most music videos. Diegetic sound was used previously by Glazer for "Rabbit in Your Headlights".

Track listings
UK CD, 12-inch, and cassette single 
 "A Song for the Lovers" (album version)
 "(Could Be) A Country Thing, City Thing, Blues Thing"
 "Precious Stone"

European CD single 
 "A Song for the Lovers" (album version)
 "(Could Be) A Country Thing, City Thing, Blues Thing"

Credits and personnel
Credits are taken from the Alone with Everybody album booklet.

Studios
 Recorded and mixed at Olympic and Metropolis Studios (London, England)
 Mastered at Metropolis Mastering (London, England)

Personnel

 Richard Ashcroft – writing, vocals, guitars, keyboards, percussion, production
 Pino Palladino – bass
 Chuck Leavell – piano
 Peter Salisbury – drums
 Steve Sidelnyk – percussion, programming
 Teena Lyle – vibes
 Duncan Mackay – trumpet
 Lucinda Barry – harp
 London Session Orchestra – strings
 Gavyn Wright – concertmaster
 Wil Malone – string arrangement and conducting
 Chris Potter – production, mixing
 Tony Cousins – mastering

Charts

Certifications

Release history

References

External links
 Watch the video on IFILM 
 Video entry on mvdbase.com
 Article about the video on MTV.com

2000 debut singles
2000 songs
Hut Records singles
Music videos directed by Jonathan Glazer
Richard Ashcroft songs
Song recordings produced by Chris Potter (record producer)
Songs written by Richard Ashcroft